Sir Monita Eru Delamere  (17 June 1921 – 28 April 1993) was a New Zealand rugby player, dry-cleaner, Ringatu leader, community leader. Of Māori descent, he identified with the Ngāi Tahu and Te Whānau-ā-Apanui iwi. He was born in Omaio, Bay of Plenty, New Zealand, on 17 June 1921. His father was Paora Kingi Delamere.

In the 1990 New Year Honours, Delamere was appointed a Knight Commander of the Order of the British Empire, for services to the Māori people. Also in 1990, he was awarded the New Zealand 1990 Commemoration Medal.

References

1921 births
1993 deaths
Ngāi Tahu people
Te Whānau-ā-Apanui people
New Zealand Māori sportspeople
New Zealand rugby union players
New Zealand Ringatū clergy
New Zealand Knights Commander of the Order of the British Empire
New Zealand justices of the peace
People from the Bay of Plenty Region